The 2015 Valencia Open was a men's tennis tournament played on indoor hard courts. It was the 21st and the last edition of the Valencia Open, part of the 250 Series of the 2015 ATP World Tour. The tournament was formerly part of the ATP World Tour 500 series but was downgraded starting this year. It was held at the Ciutat de les Arts i les Ciències in Valencia, Spain, from 26 October through 1 November 2015. Unseeded João Sousa won the singles title.

Singles main-draw entrants

Seeds

 Rankings are as of October 19, 2015

Other entrants
The following players received wildcards into the singles main draw:
  Nicolás Almagro
  Marcel Granollers
  Andrey Rublev

The following players received entry from the qualifying draw:
  Mischa Zverev
  Michał Przysiężny
  Daniel Brands
  Taro Daniel

The following player received entry as a lucky loser:
  Norbert Gombos
  Albert Montañés

Withdrawals
Before the tournament
  Sam Querrey →replaced by Aljaž Bedene
  Pablo Andújar (elbow injury)→replaced by Norbert Gombos
  David Ferrer (right elbow injury)→replaced by Albert Montañés

Doubles main-draw entrants

Seeds

 Rankings are as of October 19, 2015

Other entrants
The following pairs received wildcards into the doubles main draw:
  Pablo Carreño Busta /  Federico Delbonis
  Eduardo Russi Assumpção /  Mario Vilella Martínez

Finals

Singles

  João Sousa defeated  Roberto Bautista Agut, 3–6, 6–3, 6–4
 It was Sousa's 1st singles title of the year and the 2nd of his career.

Doubles

  Eric Butorac /  Scott Lipsky defeated  Feliciano López /  Max Mirnyi, 7–6(7–4), 6–3

References

External links
Official website 

Val
Valencia Open
Val
Valencia Open
Valencia Open